The 2011 Lory Meagher Cup was the 3rd annual fourth-tier hurling competition organised by the Gaelic Athletic Association. The teams competing were:
 Longford
 Donegal
 Tyrone
 South Down
 Leitrim
 Fermanagh
 Cavan
 Warwickshire

The winners of the 2011 Lory Meagher Cup were promoted to the 2012 Nicky Rackard Cup.

Structure
The tournament had a double elimination format - each team played at least two games before being knocked out. 
The eight teams played four Round 1 matches. 
The winners in Round 1 advanced to Round 2A.
The losers in Round 1 went into Round 2B.
There were two Round 2A matches.
The winners in Round 2A advanced to the semifinals.
The losers in Round 2A went into the quarter-finals.
There were two Round 2B matches.
The winners in Round 2B advanced to the quarter-finals.
The losers in Round 2B were eliminated.
There were two quarter-final matches between the Round 2A losers and Round 2B winners.
The winners of the quarter-finals advanced to the semifinals.
The losers of the quarter-finals were eliminated.
There were two semifinal matches between the Round 2A winners and the quarter-final winners.
The winners of the semifinals advanced to the final.
The losers of the semifinals were eliminated.
The winners of the final won the Lory Meagher Cup for 2011.

Fixtures

Round 1

Round 2A

Round 2B

Quarter-finals

Semifinals

Final

Statistics

Top scorers

Overall

Single game

Scoring
Widest winning margin: 29 points
South Down 4-25 - 0-08 Leitrim (Round 1)
Most goals in a match: 6
Longford 2-12 - 4-17	Tyrone (Round 1)
Leitrim 2-11 - 4-11 Warwickshire (Round 2B)
Most points in a match: 33
South Down 4-25 - 0-08 Leitrim (Round 1)
Most goals by one team in a match: 4
South Down 4-25 - 0-08 Leitrim (Round 1)
Tyrone 4-17 - 2-12 Longford (Round 1)
Warwickshire 4-11 - 2-11 Leitrim (Round 2B)
Warwickshire 4-08 - 1-10 Fermanagh (Quarter-final)
Most goals scored by a losing team: 2
Longford 2-12 - 4-17	Tyrone (Round 1)
Leitrim 2-11 - 4-11 Warwickshire (Round 2B)
Fermanagh 2-08 - 3-18 Donegal (Round 2A)
Most points scored by a losing team: 14
Longford 1-14 - 2-14 South Down (Quarter-final)

Lory Meagher Cup
Lory Meagher Cup